Jack Webster Awards are a series of yearly industry awards presented by the Jack Webster Foundation for outstanding achievement in journalism in the Canadian province of British Columbia. The awards were established in 1986 by the foundation and named after the late Jack Webster, who was a longtime reporter in British Columbia. Split into multiple categories, they are the top journalism honours in the province.

References 

Canadian journalism awards
Awards established in 1984
1984 establishments in British Columbia